Pandeglang Regency is a regency of Banten province, Indonesia. It is mainly located on the west and south coasts of the island of Java, and is the most westerly regency on Java Island, but it also includes a number of offshore islands such as Panaitan, Deli and Tinjil. The regency has an area of 2,746.81 km2, and an population at the 2010 Census of 1,149,610, rising to 1,272,687 at the 2020 Census; the official estimate as at mid 2022 was 1,307,090. The regency seat is the town of Pandeglang.

Administrative districts 
The Regency is divided into 35 districts (kecamatan), tabulated below with their areas and their populations at the 2010 Census and the 2020 Census, together with the official estimates as at mid 2022. The table also includes the  number of administrative villages (rural desa and urban kelurahan) in each district, and its postal codes.

Notes: (a) including 32 islands in the strait between Java and Sumatra. (b) including the two small offshore islands of Pulau Deli and Pulau Tinjil. (c) including the small offshore island of Pulau Liwungan. (d) including the small offshore island of Pulau Popole.

Tourism
The regency contains the Ujung Kulon National Park (famous for its single-horned Javan rhinoceros), Carita Beach, Tanjung Lesung Beach Resort and the public Bodur Beach (also in Tanjung Lesung).

Special Economic Zone
Based on Government Regulation (PP) No. 26/2012, PT Jababeka Tbk has been mandated to develop a Special Economic Zone in Tanjung Lesung. It is located 170 kilometers from Jakarta, through Jakarta–Tangerang Toll Road and then Tangerang–Merak Toll Road and small road to Tanjung Lesung needs 4 to 5 hours. So, the company will build a 83 kilometres highway from Serang to Panimbang, because to build toll road will be difficult with the land acquisitions. An airstrip in Panimbang is also being considered, because it only need 10 minutes to Tanjung Lesung. The company has acquired partners to build a Cruise Port in a 50 hectares area, which will be built soon.

Climate
Pandeglang has a tropical rainforest climate (Af) with heavy rainfall year-round. The following climate data is for the town of Pandeglang.

References

External links

 Official Site